{{DISPLAYTITLE:C17H14O7}}
The molecular formula C17H14O7 (molar mass : 330.29 g/mol, exact mass : 330.073953) may refer to :
 Aflatoxin g2 (CAS number 7241-98-7)
 Cirsiliol, a flavone
 Eupalitin, a flavonol
 Morelosin (CAS number: 62008-19-9), a flavonol
 Ombuin, a flavonol
 Rhamnazin, a flavonol
 Tricin, a flavone

Molecular formulas